The Climax Chicago Blues Band is the debut album by Climax Blues Band (originally known as The Climax Chicago Blues Band) recorded in 1968 and released in 1969 by EMI Records (Parlophone label) under catalog number PCS 7069. It was produced by Chris Thomas and was one of his first production projects.

Track listing
All tracks written by Climax Blues Band except where noted: 

"Mean Old World" (Big Bill Broonzy) – 3:51
"Insurance" (Waldense Hall, Charlie Singleton) – 3:47
"Going Down this Road" – 3:04
"You've Been Drinking" – 2:31
"Don't Start Me Talkin'" (Sonny Boy Williamson) – 3:20
"Wee Baby Blues" (Pete Johnson, Big Joe Turner) – 3:25
"Twenty Past One" – 3:09
"A Stranger in Your Town" (Colin Cooper, Lee Hazlewood) – 4:18
"How Many More Years" (Chester Burnett) – 3:01
"Looking for My Baby" – 2:51
"And Lonely" – 8:49
"The Entertainer" (Scott Joplin) – 2:47

Personnel
The Climax Chicago Blues Band
Colin Cooper – vocals, harmonica
Pete Haycock – lead and slide guitars, vocals
Derek Holt – rhythm guitar, organ, bass
Arthur Augustin Wood – piano, organ, celesta, harmonium
Richard Jones – bass
George Ewart Newsome – drums

Credits
Producer — Chris Thomas 
Recorded between September 27 and November 5, 1968
Engineers – Geoff Emerick, Jeff Jarrett
Front Design – Dave Kirk, Bob Wood
Back Design – Tony Robins

References
All information gathered from liner notes of The Climax Chicago Blues Band CD release by EMI Records.

External links

1969 debut albums
Climax Blues Band albums
Albums produced by Chris Thomas (record producer)